The 2014–15 Virginia Tech Hokies women's basketball team represented Virginia Tech during the 2014–15 NCAA Division I women's basketball season. Dennis Wolff resumed the responsibility as head coach for a fourth consecutive season. The Hokies were members of the Atlantic Coast Conference and play their home games at the Cassell Coliseum. They finished the season 12–20, 1–15 in ACC play to finish in a tie for fourteenth place. They advanced to the quarterfinals of the ACC women's tournament where they lost to Florida State.

2014–15 media

Virginia Tech Hokies Sports Network
The Virginia Tech Hokies IMG Sports Network will broadcast Hokies games on WNMX. Andrew Allegretta will provide the call for the games and for select ESPN3 games. All WNMX games and games not on WNMX can be heard online through HokiesXtra.

2014–15 Roster

Schedule

|-
!colspan=9 style="background:#721227; color:#F77318;"|Exhibition

|-
!colspan=9 style="background:#721227; color:#F77318;"|Regular Season

|-
!colspan=9 style="background:#F77318;"| 2015 ACC Tournament

Rankings
2014–15 NCAA Division I women's basketball rankings

See also
 Virginia Tech Hokies women's basketball

References

Virginia Tech Hokies women's basketball seasons
Virginia Tech
Virginia Tech Hokies women's basketball
Virginia Tech